WAR Anniversary Show was a professional wrestling event produced by the Japanese professional wrestling promotion Wrestle Association R (WAR) to commemorate the anniversary of the promotion's founding by Genichiro Tenryu in 1992. The event to celebrate its anniversary was held between 1993 and 2000.

Dates, venues and main events

Results

1st Anniversary of Revolution

1st Anniversary of Revolution marked the first anniversary of Wrestling and Romance after the promotion was established in 1992. The event took place on June 17, 1993 at the Nippon Budokan in Tokyo, Japan, drawing a crowd of 14,300 people.
Results

2nd Anniversary of Revolution

2nd Anniversary of Revolution marked the second anniversary of Wrestling and Romance. The event took place on July 17, 1994 at the Sumo Hall in Tokyo, Japan, drawing a crowd of 11,050 people. The event featured a special six-man tag team tournament, in which eight six-man teams were paired in three rounds and paired Atsushi Onita and WAR owner Genichiro Tenryu in one team along with Crusher Bam Bam Bigelow, just a few months after Tenryu had beaten Onita in a no ropes barbed wire deathmatch at FMW 5th Anniversary Show.
Results

Tournament bracket

3rd Anniversary Show

3rd Anniversary Show took place on July 7, 1995 at the Sumo Hall in Tokyo, Japan.
Results

4th Anniversary Show

4th Anniversary Show commemorated the fourth anniversary of WAR. The event took place on July 20, 1996 at the Sumo Hall in Tokyo, Japan. The event featured an eight-team tournament for the vacant World Six-Man Tag Team Championship, which had been vacated by previous champions Fuyuki-Gun after they vacated the title in June to participate in the tournament.
Results

Tournament bracket

5th Anniversary Show

5th Anniversary Show commemorated the fifth anniversary of WAR. The event took place on July 6, 1997 at the Sumo Hall in Tokyo, Japan. The show was headlined by a main event between Genichiro Tenryu and Tarzan Goto, which Tenryu won. A match was held for the vacant World Six-Man Tag Team Championship at the event, in which Koki Kitahara, Lance Storm and Nobutaka Araya defeated Mitsuharu Kitao, Nobukazu Hirai and Tommy Dreamer to capture the vacant title. The event was televised on Samurai! TV.
Results

7th Anniversary Show

7th Anniversary Show was the seventh anniversary event of Wrestle Association R, which took place on June 20, 1999 at the Korakuen Hall in Tokyo, Japan. This marked the first time that the event was held at the Korakuen Hall and the first time that it was held at any other venue instead of Sumo Hall, where the previous four Anniversary Show events had taken place. In the main event, Genichiro Tenryu revived his feud with Atsushi Onita as the two captained opposite teams in a Street Fight Tornado Deathmatch.
Results

8 Years Later

8 Years Later marked the eighth anniversary of Wrestle Association R and was the final event of the promotion before Genichiro Tenryu closed it down to return to All Japan Pro Wrestling (AJPW). The event took place on July 13, 2000 at the Korakuen Hall in Tokyo, Japan and was headlined by an interpromotional match in which Tenryu took on Frontier Martial-Arts Wrestling wrestler Hayabusa.
Results

References

WAR (wrestling promotion) events
Recurring events established in 1993
Recurring events disestablished in 2000
Professional wrestling in Tokyo
Professional wrestling anniversary shows